The men's Greco-Roman 98 kilograms is a competition featured at the 2017 World Wrestling Championships, and was held in Paris, France on 21 August 2017.

Results
Legend
F — Won by fall

Finals

Top half

Section 1

Section 2

Bottom half

Section 3

Section 4

Repechage

References

External links
Official website

Men's Greco-Roman 98 kg